Xenopol is a Romanian surname. It is the surname of the notable Xenopol family from Romania, a family of Greek and Jewish origins. It may refer to:

 Adela Xenopol (1861–1939), Romanian writer and feminist, sister of Alexandru and Nicolae
 Alexandru Dimitrie Xenopol (1847–1920), Romanian scholar, essayist, historic, member of the Romanian Academy, brother of the second
 Margareta Xenopol (1892-1979), composer and pianist, daughter of Alexandru
 Nicolae Xenopol (1858–1917), Romanian politician and diplomat, brother of the first

References 

Romanian-language surnames